Pirapora do Bom Jesus is a municipality in the state of São Paulo in Brazil. It is part of the Metropolitan Region of São Paulo. The population is 19,178 (2020 est.) in an area of 108.49 km². The name Pirapora comes from the Tupi language.

Culture
Pirapora is the biggest Brazilian shrine after Aparecida. A sculpture of the Good Jesus is venerated here.

See also
Pirapora

References

External links
Santuário do Senhor Bom Jesus

Municipalities in São Paulo (state)
Roman Catholic shrines in Brazil